Oleg Gogol (born 4 December 1968) is a Belarusian wrestler. He competed in the men's freestyle 68 kg at the 1996 Summer Olympics.

References

1968 births
Living people
Belarusian male sport wrestlers
Olympic wrestlers of Belarus
Wrestlers at the 1996 Summer Olympics
Place of birth missing (living people)